Mount Hebron Temperance Hall, also known as Division Room of the Saludavill Division No. 47, Sons of Temperance and Division Room of the Mt. Hebron Division No. 7, Sons of Temperance, is a historic temperance hall located at West Columbia, Lexington County, South Carolina. It was built in 1862, and is a small, one-story rectangular frame building. It is sheathed in weatherboard and has a gable roof. The building originally housed local chapters of the Sons of Temperance.  It was restored in 1979, and is located in the churchyard of the Mount Hebron United Methodist Church. The church uses it as a Sunday School building and Boy Scout Hut.

It was listed on the National Register of Historic Places in 1980.

References

Clubhouses on the National Register of Historic Places in South Carolina
Buildings and structures completed in 1862
Buildings and structures in Lexington County, South Carolina
National Register of Historic Places in Lexington County, South Carolina
1862 establishments in South Carolina